Left Field Productions, Inc. was an American independent video game development studio located in Ventura, California. Founded in 1994 by industry veterans John Brandwood, Jeff Godfrey and Mike Lamb, Left Field is probably best known for their time spent as a Nintendo third-party developer, during which they designed the critically acclaimed Nintendo 64 game Excitebike 64.

On April 23, 1998, Nintendo announced the purchase of a minority interest in Left Field Productions, allowing them to expand operations and ensuring a steady flow of exclusive content from the developer. In September 2002, after months of speculation, Left Field bought out Nintendo's stake in the company, once again becoming a fully independent third-party developer.

The studio closed in 2011, shortly after releasing Mayhem to mixed reviews.

Games developed 
1995: Slam 'N' Jam `95 (3DO)
1996: Slam 'N' Jam `96 Featuring Magic & Kareem (PlayStation, Sega Saturn)
1996: Slam 'N' Jam (PC)
1998: Kobe Bryant in NBA Courtside (Nintendo 64)
1999: Disney's Beauty and the Beast: A Board Game Adventure (Game Boy Color)
1999: NBA 3 on 3 featuring Kobe Bryant (Game Boy Color)
1999: NBA Courtside 2: Featuring Kobe Bryant (Nintendo 64)
2000: 3-D Ultra Pinball: Thrillride (Game Boy Color)
2000: Disney's The Little Mermaid II: Pinball Frenzy (Game Boy Color)
2000: Excitebike 64 (Nintendo 64, Nintendo iQue)
2002: Backyard Football (GameCube)
2002: NBA Courtside 2002 (GameCube)
2004: MTX Mototrax (PlayStation 2, Xbox, PC, Mac)
2005: World Series of Poker (GameCube, PlayStation 2, PlayStation Portable, Xbox)
2006: MTX Mototrax (PlayStation Portable)
2006: World Series of Poker: Tournament of Champions (PlayStation 2, Xbox 360, PlayStation Portable, Wii)
2006: Dave Mirra BMX Challenge (PlayStation Portable)
2007: Dave Mirra BMX Challenge (Wii)
2007: World Series of Poker: Battle for the Bracelets (PlayStation 3, PlayStation 2, Xbox 360, PlayStation Portable)
2007: Nitrobike (Wii, PlayStation 2)
2008: SCORE International Baja 1000 (Xbox 360, PlayStation 3, PlayStation 2, Wii)
2011: Mayhem (Xbox 360, PlayStation 3)

Canceled and unreleased projects 
A GameCube version of MTX Mototrax was in the works but was later canceled as publisher Activision scaled back support for the platform.

A sequel to the Nintendo 64 game 1080° Snowboarding was in development at Left Field at one time. Development originated on the Nintendo 64 platform but was later shifted to the GameCube once Nintendo began phasing out the Nintendo 64. When Left Field separated with Nintendo in early 2002, Nintendo Software Technology took over development of the game, releasing 1080° Avalanche on December 1, 2003.  It is unknown how far into production the game was when Left Field left the project, or just how much, if any, of Left Field's work is present in the final game. It has been speculated that Left Field's version of the game had a much more arcade-like feel than its successor.

Awards 
Best Extreme Sports Game – MTX Mototrax (2004, Play Magazine)
IGN Editor's Choice Award – Excitebike 64 (2000, IGN)
IGN Editor's Choice Award – MTX Mototrax (2004, IGN)
IGN Editor's Choice Award – NBA Courtside 2: Featuring Kobe Bryant (1999, IGN)

References

External links 
Left Field Productions website (archive)

Video game companies of the United States
Video game development companies
Video game companies established in 1994
Video game companies disestablished in 2011
Companies based in Ventura County, California